St Ethelwold's Church, Shotton, is in the town of Shotton, Flintshire, Wales.  It is an active Anglican parish church in the deanery of Hawarden, the archdeaconry of Wrexham, and the diocese of St Asaph  It is designated by Cadw as a Grade II listed building.

History

The church building was paid for partly by W. E. Gladstone but construction was not started until after his death; money was collected largely by his son Rev. Stephen Gladstone. It was built between 1898 and 1902 to a design by Douglas and Minshull of Chester in Gothic Revival style. It was intended that the church should have a tower and a spire, but these architectural features were not included at the time. The lower stage of a tower was added in 1924.

The church was dedicated by A. G. Edwards, Bishop of St Asaph, on 8 August 1902.

Architecture

The church is built in sandstone ashlar both externally and internally.  It has a clerestory and a chancel with an apse, the chancel being higher than the nave.  At the west end are three small lancet windows with stained glass by Edward Reginald Frampton.

See also
List of new churches by John Douglas

References

Shotton, Saint Ethelwold's Church
Shotton, Saint Ethelwold's Church
Shotton
Churches completed in 1902
Shotton
Shotton, Saint Ethelwold's Church
Shotton